Dubini is a surname. Notable people with the surname include:

Angelo Dubini (1813–1902), Italian physician 
Benedetta Dubini (born 1987), London-based, Italian-born jewellery designer
Fosco Dubini (born 1954), Swiss director and documentary filmmaker
Kevin Dubini (born 1993), Argentine footballer